Naujamiestis (literally: new city in Lithuanian) can refer to:

Kudirkos Naumiestis, a city in Šakiai district municipality, Lithuania
Naujamiestis, Panevėžys, a town in Panevėžys district municipality, Lithuania
Naujamiestis, Vilnius, a neighborhood in Vilnius, capital of Lithuania
Žemaičių Naumiestis, a town in Šilutė district municipality, Lithuania